Mohammed Masoom Stanekzai (Pashto: محمد معصوم ستانکزی; 1958) is a former chief of National Directorate of Security (NDS). He became the chief of National Directorate of Security (NDS) in 2016. In 2019, he was forced to resign following an extrajudicial killing of Afghan civilians by an NDS unit during a night raid in 2019.

Previously, he has served as Minister of Telecommunications and Information Technology from 2002 to 2004 and later as a security advisor for former president Hamid Karzai. He has also worked as the CEO of the joint secretariat of Afghanistan Peace and Reintegration Program in 2009. In May 2015, he was nominated as Minister of Defense by Ashraf Ghani. However, Masoom Stanekzai nomination was repeatedly rejected by Wolesi Jirga (lower house). As a result, Masoom stanekzai remained as acting minister of defense but with full authority through Presidential decree. He was loyalist ally of president Ashraf Ghani.

Early life
Masoom Stanekzai was born in 1958 in Mughul khel village of Mohammad Agha District of Logar Province. He belongs to the Stanikzai tribe and born to a middle-class family. He is the third child of Mahmood Khan, a government servant.

Education
Mohammad Massoom Stanekzai earned a master's degree in philosophy of engineering for sustainable development from Cambridge University in 2006 and a master’s in business management from Preston University while he has a  B.A. from the Kabul Telecom Institute and is a graduate of the Kabul Military University. He can speak Dari, Pashto and English fluently.
In 2008 Masoom was made a visiting fellow at the United States Institute of Peace.
Mohammad Masoom Stanekzai was made the 
Jennings Randolph Afghanistan Fellow from 1 May 2008 to 28 February 2009.

Stanekzai's research focuses on security, reconstruction and reconciliation in Afghanistan.

Career
After graduating from high school, Masoom Stanekzai joined Kabul Telecommunication Institute and after that he graduated from Kabul Military University and joined the Afghan National Army (ANA). He served in the Afghan National Army for more than a decade rising up to the rank of colonel. No official dates of Masoom stanekzai service in military is given, so it is believed that it was during regime of People's Democratic Party of Afghanistan (PDPA). He fought against the Mujahideen during the Soviet-Afghan war. Later, he served as director of the Agency for Rehabilitation and Energy Conservation in Afghanistan from 2001 to 2002. From 2002 to 2004, he served as a minister of telecommunication/information and communications technology in the Afghan Transitional Government. He has also served as secretary of the High Council for Peace and Reconciliation from 2010 to 2014.

Masoom Stanekzai has also served as security of advisor of the then president of Afghanistan Hamid Karzai. On 20 September 2011, Masoom Stanekzai was seriously injured following a suicide attack that killed Peace Council Chairman Berhanuddin Rabbani. In 2015, Masoom Stanekzai was nominated as Minister of Defense by president Ashraf Ghani. However, his nomination was repeatedly rejected by Afghan lower house. As result, he served as acting defense minister until he was appointed as the new head of National Directorate of Security (NDS).

Resignation
Masoom Stanekzai was forced to resign in 2019, following an extrajudicial killing of four Afghan civilians during a night raid conducted by a NDS unit in Jalalabad city of Nangarhar province. National Directorate of Security (NDS) officials claimed that those civilians who were killed during the raid were members of Islamic State of Iraq and the Levant (ISIS). However, locals residents and some Afghan government officials rejected NDS claims. Local resident stated that 'two out of the four victims worked with the Afghan government while the other two had their own business'. Former Afghan Ambassador to Pakistan, Dr. Omar Zakhilwal, also said that the victims were all innocent civilians. Furthermore, he said that such type of raids by NDS units have been carried out on almost daily basis in different parts of Nangarhar province.

Following the killing of four Afghan civilians, local resident of Nangarhar province staged protest against the National Directorate of Security. Local residents insisted that those who were killed in the night raid by a NDS unit were all innocent people and they had no links with ISIS. Later on, Ashraf Ghani said that "he had regretfully accepted the resignation of NDS chief, Mr. Stanikzai." Ashraf Ghani also ordered the killing to be investigated. However, the families of the victims stated that they don't trust the government.

Masoom Stanekzai was succeeded by Ahmad Zia Saraj as a new chief of National Directorate of Security (NDS).

References

Living people
Defence ministers of Afghanistan
Pashtun people
Alumni of the University of Cambridge
1958 births